Nilakkal St. Thomas Ecumenical Church is one of the earliest Christian church in Kerala, India. This church is one among the Ezharappallikal (seven and a half churches) believed to be established in 54 AD by St. Thomas, one of the twelve apostles of Jesus Christ.

Nilakkal, also known as Chayal is a forest area, but once it was a place of great importance carried on trade with Madhura and Thirunelveli. Even though there is no historical evidence of the missionary work of St. Thomas in Nilackal, some assumptions of St. Thomas's establishment of a church in this place is written in old metal plates and other historian writings.

Since the old church is in a dilapidated stage, a new church has been constructed in a site not far from it. At present time, this church functioning as an ecumenical church maintained by various Episcopal Churches in India.

References

Churches in Pathanamthitta district
Ēḻarappaḷḷikaḷ